The 2019–20 Liga IV Neamț was the 52nd season of Liga IV Neamț, the fourth tier of the Romanian football league system. The season began on 1 September 2019 and was scheduled to end in June 2020, but was suspended in March because of the COVID-19 pandemic in Romania. 

AJF Neamț (County Football Association) decided to end the season on July 26 2020 with a play-off match between the top ranked teams in the two series.On 23 July 2020, Victoria Horia announced that it cannot comply with the conditions imposed by the medical protocol. Following this decisions, Bradu Borca was declared the county champion and the representative of Neamț County at the promotion play-off to Liga III.

Team changes 
For this season, County Football Association (AJF Neamț) has announced that the county football championship will have only one level, which will be attended by the teams from the Liga IV Neamț and Liga V Neamț of the previous season and new formed teams.

To Liga IV Neamț
Relegated from Liga III
 —

From Liga IV Neamț
Promoted to Liga III
 Ozana Târgu Neamț

Promoted from Liga V Neamț

 Bravo Bodești
 Vulturul Costișa
 Zorile Urecheni
 Ozana Timișești
 Voința Dochia
 Stejarul Țibucani
 Viitorul Podoleni
 Girov

 Flacăra Brusturi
 Grumăzești
 Voința Valea Ursului
 Voința Bozieni
 WST Oniceni
 Stejarul Stănița
 Siretul Doljești

New teams
 Moldova Pildești
 Unirea Trifești
 Cetatea Gâdinți
 Voința Ion Creangă

Competition format
The league consisted of 24 teams divided into 2 series of 12 teams and will play a regular season, followed by a play-off. The regular season is a double round-robin tournament. At the end of regular season, the first 4 ranked teams in each series will qualify for championship play-off and the winner will participate for promotion play-off to Liga III.

League tables

Series A

Series B

Championship play-off

Bradu Borca won the 2019–20 Liga IV Neamț  and qualify for promotion play-off.''

Promotion play-off

Champions of Liga IV – Neamț County face champions of Liga IV – Suceava County and Liga IV – Iași County.

Region 1 (North–East)

Group A

See also

Main Leagues
 2019–20 Liga I
 2019–20 Liga II
 2019–20 Liga III
 2019–20 Liga IV

County Leagues (Liga IV series)

 2019–20 Liga IV Alba
 2019–20 Liga IV Arad
 2019–20 Liga IV Argeș
 2019–20 Liga IV Bacău
 2019–20 Liga IV Bihor
 2019–20 Liga IV Bistrița-Năsăud
 2019–20 Liga IV Botoșani
 2019–20 Liga IV Brăila
 2019–20 Liga IV Brașov
 2019–20 Liga IV Bucharest
 2019–20 Liga IV Buzău
 2019–20 Liga IV Călărași
 2019–20 Liga IV Caraș-Severin
 2019–20 Liga IV Cluj
 2019–20 Liga IV Constanța
 2019–20 Liga IV Covasna
 2019–20 Liga IV Dâmbovița
 2019–20 Liga IV Dolj 
 2019–20 Liga IV Galați
 2019–20 Liga IV Giurgiu
 2019–20 Liga IV Gorj
 2019–20 Liga IV Harghita
 2019–20 Liga IV Hunedoara
 2019–20 Liga IV Ialomița
 2019–20 Liga IV Iași
 2019–20 Liga IV Ilfov
 2019–20 Liga IV Maramureș
 2019–20 Liga IV Mehedinți
 2019–20 Liga IV Mureș
 2019–20 Liga IV Olt
 2019–20 Liga IV Prahova
 2019–20 Liga IV Sălaj
 2019–20 Liga IV Satu Mare
 2019–20 Liga IV Sibiu
 2019–20 Liga IV Suceava
 2019–20 Liga IV Teleorman
 2019–20 Liga IV Timiș
 2019–20 Liga IV Tulcea
 2019–20 Liga IV Vâlcea
 2019–20 Liga IV Vaslui
 2019–20 Liga IV Vrancea

References

External links
 Official website 

Liga IV seasons
Sport in Neamț County